Sir John Kaputin, CMG is a Papua New Guinean athlete and politician.

Kaputin was born on 11 July 1941 on Matupit Island, East New Britain Province. After his primary schooling in the province, he proceeded onto Rockhampton Boys Grammar School in Queensland, Australia (1956-1959) where he completed his secondary school.

He represented Papua and New Guinea as a sprinter at the 1962 British Empire and Commonwealth Games.

He then qualified for a scholarship to study at the University of Hawaii in Honolulu (1966 – 1968), after which returned home to complete his studies at the University of Papua New Guinea in 1969.

Kaputin became an influential member and leader of the Mataungan Association in Rabaul. The association was a local Tolai grouping that was angered by the alienation of land by Germans and Australian plantation owners.

Armed with the leadership skills he had honed, he contested and easily won the 1972 General Elections and became the member for Rabaul Open for Papua New Guinea's National Parliament. Kaputin was appointed Minister of Finance under the Chan/Okuk Government in 1980. Whilst Minister for Finance, Kaputin was instrumental in crafting important legislation to establish Papua New Guinea's private company employees retirement fund, the National Provident Fund, which later became the National Superannuation Fund of Papua New Guinea NASFUND. Kwila Insurance was also introduced under Kaputin.

Kaputin was the foreign minister of Papua New Guinea from 1992 until 1994 and from December 1999 until 2000. He is a co-founder of the Melanesian Alliance Party. He was named Companion of the Order of St. Michael and St. George in 1983 and Knight Bachelor in 1997.

In March 2005, he took office as secretary-general of the African, Caribbean and Pacific Group of States, holding the position until 2010.

In December 2011, Kaputin, alongside Edward Laboran, became the inaugural inductees into the Papua New Guinea Olympic Committee Sporting Hall of Fame.

References

 Profiles of Panelists. United Nations Industrial Development Organization. Accessed 2011-02-24.
 John KAPUTIN, ACP Secretariat, Secretary General. European Commission. Accessed 2011-02-24.

1941 births
Living people
Foreign Ministers of Papua New Guinea
Ministers of Finance of Papua New Guinea
Melanesian Alliance Party politicians
Papua New Guinean male sprinters
Athletes (track and field) at the 1962 British Empire and Commonwealth Games
Commonwealth Games competitors for Papua New Guinea
Papua New Guinean Knights Bachelor
Papua New Guinean sportsperson-politicians
Companions of the Order of St Michael and St George